Sakhamuru is a neighbourhood and a part of Urban Notified Area of Amaravati, the state capital of the Indian state of Andhra Pradesh. It was a village in Thullur mandal of in Guntur district, prior to its denotification as gram panchayat.

Demographics 

The average literacy rate stands at 66.88%.

Transport

Sakhamuru is located 1km away from the Thullur and Guntur route. APSRTC run buses provide transport services from Guntur to Thulluru.

References

Neighbourhoods in Amaravati